2nd Jharkhand Assembly was constituted after the 2005 Jharkhand Legislative Assembly election. The 2005 election was the first Jharkhand state assembly election conducted in Jharkhand.

Composition

References 

2nd
2005 establishments in Jharkhand
2005